The Mobile Legends: Bang Bang tournament for the 2021 Southeast Asian Games was held on May 18 to 20 at the Vietnam National Convention Center in Hanoi, Vietnam. This was the second iteration of the MLBB Tournament in the Southeast Asian Games, the first one being held in 2019.

The tournament consisted of a group stage and a single-elimination playoff round.

Summary 
The Philippines were the defending champions. They retained their title after beating Indonesia 3-1 in the final.

Participating teams 

 Indonesia (INA)
 Laos (LAO)
 Malaysia (MAS)
 Myanmar (MYA)
 Philippines (PHI)
 Singapore (SGP)
 Vietnam (VIE)

Results

Group stage

Group A 

Reference:

Group B 

 Vietnam and Singapore had the same final result during the Group Stage. During the Semifinals, the Tiebreaker game was held and whoever won the game, will face-off the Philippines. Singapore 1-0 Vietnam.

Final round

Semifinals 

|}
Reference:

Grand Finals 

|}
Reference:

Bronze-medal match 

|}
Reference:

References 

2022 in esports
2022 multiplayer online battle arena tournaments
2022 in Vietnamese sport
Esports at the 2021 Southeast Asian Games
Mobile Legends: Bang Bang competitions